The Battle of Gandesa took place in April 1938 during the Spanish Civil War.

Background
After the fall of Caspe, the Nationalists troops continued their advance towards Catalonia  with the support of the Legion Condor and the Aviazione Legionaria. By the end of February the nationalists had reached the outskirts of Gandesa. The XV International Brigade had been retreating since the Aragón Offensive began, and the republican lines collapsed.

The battle followed the decision of the XV International Brigade to dig in and hold the town of Gandesa in an effort to slow down  the Francoist troops, which had been advancing steadily since the beginning of the offensive.

Battle
The town of Gandesa was held by the XV International Brigade. The Nationalists attacked with troops of Mario Berti's CTV and Monasterio's Army Corps. Despite the prowess of the British troops, Gandesa fell on 3 April and 140 British and American members of the International Brigades were captured. However, the resistance of the XV Brigade allowed the Republican troops to regroup and to withdraw some material across the Ebro River.

Cultural references
This battle is mentioned in the song Jamie Foyers, where the fictional hero is killed.

See also 

 List of Spanish Nationalist military equipment of the Spanish Civil War
 List of weapons of the Corpo Truppe Volontarie
 Aviazione Legionaria
 Condor Legion
 List of Spanish Republican military equipment of the Spanish Civil War

References

Gandesa 1938
Gandesa 1938
1938 in Spain
Gandesa 1938
Province of Tarragona
Gandesa 1938
April 1938 events